Bratislava Foothills is a small mountain range located in Bratislava, the capital of Slovakia. It is part of the Devín Carpathians mountain range, located in the northwest of the city. Mean altitude of the mountain range is 250 metres above sea level.

Peaks
 Bratislava Castle hill - features the Bratislava Castle
 Somársky vrch
 Napoleon's hill
 Bôrik - features the Bôrik Protected Area
 Slavín - features the Slavín war memorial
 Murmannova výšina
 Kalvária
 Holý vrch/Machnáč

See also
 Geography of Bratislava
 Little Carpathians

References

Landforms of Slovakia
Geography of Bratislava